The women's +78 kg competition at the 2020 European Judo Championships was held on 21 November at the O2 Arena.

Results

Main bracket

Repechage

References

External links
 

W79
European Judo Championships Women's Heavyweight
European W79